Genghis Khan  (Chinese: 战神纪) is a Chinese historical / fantasy epic film produced by Jean-Jacques Annaud and directed by Hasi Chaolu. It stars William Chan as the titular Genghis Khan. The film, originally slated to be  released in China on December 22, 2017, was subsequently postponed to April 28, 2018 to allow the  team more time for post-production work. The film was also the closing film at the 8th Beijing International Film Festival.

Synopsis
Temüjin and Börte are childhood lovers who are deeply in love; but news of Temüjin's father's death swiftly disrupted their relationship. Temüjin heads back to his hometown, but was faced with a sudden attack from his father's former comrades, causing his whole tribe to be destroyed.

Cast
William Chan as Temüjin
Lin Yun as Börte
Hu Jun as Kuchlug
Ba Sen
Zhao Lixin
Ni Dahong
Li Guangjie as Jamukha
Zhang Xinyi
Tu Men as Jamukha's father
Li Shengda
Bayin
Yong Mei as Hoelun

Original soundtrack

References

External links
 

Chinese historical drama films
Chinese war drama films
Chinese epic films
Depictions of Genghis Khan on film
Films set in Mongolia
Films set in the Mongol Empire